Veeracholan is a village of Virudhunagar District in the state of Tamil Nadu, India. As of the 2017 India census, it had a population of 9000, with 6000 males and 3000 females.

Educational institutions
There are two primary schools, one secondary school, one higher secondary school and one matriculation school. There is also one Arabic college at the entry of the village.

Monday market
People from the surrounding area gather at the Monday market to purchase household items like plastic and steel utensils, vegetables, snacks, fruits, flowers, which are in turn be sold by marketers in the area.

On the same day, other things also available like poultry (hens) and goats and sheep. This market started over a century ago. If a festival falls on Monday, the market is advanced to the day before.

Villages in Virudhunagar district